Ellychnia corrusca, or winter firefly, is a species of firefly in the genus Ellychnia. It is a lantern-less diurnal beetle common throughout the United States and Canada. They favor Quercus, Carya, and Liriodendron tulipifera.

The mating season is approximately six weeks in length, occurring early April through mid-May.

The mating process consists of the Ellychnia adults crawling around tree trunks looking for mates in the early spring. Males first contact females with their antennae before they mount females dorsally to initiate copulation.

References

Lampyridae
Beetles described in 1767
Taxa named by Carl Linnaeus